Combining Diacritical Marks for Symbols is a Unicode block containing arrows, dots, enclosures, and overlays for modifying symbol characters.

Its block name in Unicode 1.0 was simply Diacritical Marks for Symbols.

Block

History
The following Unicode-related documents record the purpose and process of defining specific characters in the Combining Diacritical Marks for Symbols block:

References 

Unicode blocks